Demo Piece is a 2020 Indian Kannada-language comedy drama directed by Vivek A. and starring Bharath Bopanna, Sparsha Rekha (the film's producer) and Sonal Monteiro.

Cast 
Bharath Bopanna as Harsha
Sparsha Rekha as Harsha's mother
Sonal Monteiro as Aadya 
Chandrachud
Rockline Sudhakar
Seema

Reception 
A critic from The Times of India wrote that "Demo Piece can be a one-time watch if you like college capers or dramas that run high on family sentiment and have a message too". A critic from The New Indian Express wrote that "It almost appears that the director considers the film a ‘demo piece’, a product that he wants to try and test on the viewers". A critic from The News Minute wrote that "Demo Piece, with the mindless plot, is a painful watch".

References 

Indian comedy-drama films
2020s Kannada-language films